GorakhNath Pandey (Hindi - गोरखनाथ पाण्डेय ) (Born 25 April 1951) is an Indian politician, representing the Bharatiya Janta Party. He represented Bhadohi constituency in the 15th Lok Sabha on Bahujan Samaj Party Ticket. He was also MLA in 1996-2002 from Gyanpur Constituency On Bharatiya Janta Party . Currently he is a member of National Council BJP & UP BJP Working Committee . He was teacher before joining the politics.

References 

http://india.gov.in/govt/loksabhampbiodata.php?mpcode=4308

India MPs 2009–2014
1951 births
Living people
Bahujan Samaj Party politicians from Uttar Pradesh
People from Bhadohi district
Lok Sabha members from Uttar Pradesh